Kabutarak (also Romanized as Kabūtarak) is a village in Sojas Rud Rural District, Sojas Rud District, Khodabandeh County, Zanjan Province, Iran. At the 2006 census, its population was 37, in 9 families.

References 

Populated places in Khodabandeh County